Robo Story (sometimes referred to as Robostory) is a French cartoon series that was created by Michel Pillyser and Bernard Kessler for the French production company Belokapi and first televised in 1985. It ran for 52 episodes that were each 13 minutes long, (each actual story ran for about 25 minutes each so there may only be 26 true episodes depending on the format it is presented in).

The series was subsequently broadcast internationally, including an English dubbed version that was shown on Australian and British TV.

Summary

Robo Story follows the adventures of a small, orange-haired girl called Myrtille and her dog Loufi. In the opening title sequence we see Myrtille chase the mischievous Loufi onto a space shuttle that takes off with her inside. The ship crash lands on a world known as the Green Planet.

The Green Planet is inhabited by robots. In the original French version these were the evil Rotors, and the friendly Robors. English language versions changed this slightly, renaming the evil robots the 'Wrigglers', and the friendly robots the 'Robos'.

Wrigglers

The Wrigglers were black and spindly, their torsos were shaped like 44 gallon drums, with domed heads that resembled safari hats. They were led by the White Wriggler, who was shaped somewhat like Darth Vader's helmet. He was in turn instructed by a disembodied voice known as 'Revered Reverence.' White Wriggler's frequent incompetence would lead to him being named the "lowest of the low" by the Revered Reverence, and turned black. Despite been the leader of the Wrigglers, White Wriggler was not particularly evil, his incompetence and lack of intelligence often made him more comical than villainous; he was also afraid of Loufi, (called Fluffy in the English version) the sight of whom would often turn him from a hostile dictator into a quivering heap.

Robos

The Robos were mainly bell-shaped and variously coloured. They were led by a spindlier robot named Old Robot who was often seen wearing a purple hat and using a cane. Other Robo characters included Robot Colossus, Robot Moron, Robot Radar, Robot Magician and Robot Hobo.

Robot Pasha, the green coloured military Robo was a skinny fool who was overly enthusiastic about the prospect of war, when the other Robos were hiding from the Wrigglers, he would jump up and shout "Attack!" before being muzzled and sat upon by the other Robos.

Robot  Moron would answer "I don't know" to any question he was asked, but on other occasions would philosophize, and when asked by the other Robos what he was talking about, would answer once more "I don't know."

Robot Radar was a blue coloured robot, whose upper half could flip open, and a Radar dish would appear; from this he could both act as a spy, -to determine what the Wrigglers were planning- or provide entertainment by picking up signals, and acting as a television set.

Robot Magician was a legend among the other Robos who would occasionally appear to save the day. In one episode, when the Wrigglers had amassed an army to crush the Robos once and for all, Robot Magician sent all the Wrigglers into orbit and drove their leader insane.

Robot Hobo would laze around in a junkyard getting drunk on oil.

The series revolved around Myrtille (or 'Blueberry' as she was known in the English version.) trying to get to her space-shuttle (which the Wrigglers had stolen) so she could return to Earth. A running gag in the series was that Myrtille/Blueberry was sometimes referred to as the "girl-man" due to the Robos originally misidentifying her as a man. In the final episode Robot Magician sneaked into the Wriggler's headquarters and deactivated the central computer (the Revered Reverence). White Wriggler is thereafter seen with Myrtille/Blueberry as she is preparing to return to Earth. He has apparently made peace with the Robos, suggesting he was never really evil to begin with, and was only acting out of fear of the Revered Reverence. Myrtille plans to bring the Robos back to Earth with her, but the shuttle accidentally launches with only her and Robot Hobo on board. As they speed away from the Green Planet she turns and sees that Robot Hobo has become Robot Magician, who in fact he was all along.

The series employed a quite idiosyncratic style of animation, notable especially for its dark tone and sparse, industrial soundtrack.

References
Pictures from Planete-jeunesse.com (Fr)

External links
 Robo Story on imdb

French children's animated science fiction television series
French children's animated space adventure television series
1985 French television series debuts
1980s French animated television series
ITV children's television shows
Australian Broadcasting Corporation original programming
Canal+ original programming
Animated television series about children
Animated television series about dogs